Samsung Z2 is a smartphone produced by Samsung. It is the third smartphone to be shipped with the Tizen operating system, after the Samsung Z1 and Samsung Z3. It was released on August 29, 2016.

Its successor the Samsung Z4 was released in May 2017.

Specifications

Hardware 
The Galaxy Z2 is powered by an Exynos 3475 SoC including a quad-core 1.3 GHz ARM Cortex-A7 CPU, an ARM Mali-T720 GPU and 1 GB RAM. The 8 GB internal storage can be upgraded up to 256 GB via microSD card.

It features a 4.7-inch Super AMOLED display. The rear camera has 5 megapixels with LED flash, f/2.2 aperture and autofocus; the front camera has 2  megapixels with f/2.2 aperture.

Software 
The Galaxy Z2 is shipped with Android 5.1.1 "Lollipop" and Samsung's TouchWiz user interface.

References

External links 
Samsung Z2 Official Firmware

Samsung mobile phones
Tizen-based devices
Mobile phones introduced in 2016
Discontinued smartphones